The Akari Chargers is a professional women's volleyball team owned by Akari Lighting & Technology Corporation, that is playing in the Premier Volleyball League (PVL). The team debuted in the 2022 Premier Volleyball League Reinforced Conference in October 2022.

History
The Akari Chargers was created by the Akari Lighting & Technology Corporation, announcing its official entry into the Premier Volleyball League as the 10th professional club team. Akari's has been a longtime sponsor of the  Adamson Lady Falcons collegiate volleyball team which clinched the 2019 Premier Volleyball League Collegiate Conference.

Before the start of the 2022 reinforced conference, Akari announced that it tapped Brazilian head coach of the Philippines women's national volleyball team, Jorge Edson to be its head coach.

Current roster

Coaching staff
 Head coach:Jorge Edson
 Assistant coaches:Norman MiguelEd OrtegaLorden Tiu

Team staff
 Team manager:Mozzy Ravena
 Trainer:Grace Gomez

Medical staff
 Physical therapist:

Previous roster
For the 2022 Premier Volleyball League Reinforced Conference:

Coaching staff
 Head coach:Jorge Edson
 Assistant coaches:Norman MiguelEd OrtegaLorden Tiu

Team staff
 Team manager:Mozzy Ravena
 Trainer:Grace Gomez

Medical staff
 Physical therapist:

Honors

Team
Premier Volleyball League:

Team captains 
  Michelle Cobb (2022– present)

Imports 
  Prisilla Rivera (2022)

Former players

Local players

 Bingle Landicho 
 Geneveve Casugod
 Andrea Marzan

Foreign players

 Prisilla Rivera

Coaches
  Jorge Edson (2022–present)

References

Volleyball clubs established in 2022
Women's volleyball teams in the Philippines